The New Normal is an American sitcom that aired on NBC from September 10, 2012, to April 2, 2013. The series was created and principally written by Ryan Murphy and Ali Adler. The storyline follows wealthy gay couple Bryan (Andrew Rannells) and David (Justin Bartha), who are living in Los Angeles. Deciding to have a child, they choose a surrogate mother, Goldie Clemmons (Georgia King), who moves into their home with her 9-year-old daughter Shania (Bebe Wood).
The series aired Tuesdays at 9:30 pm Eastern/8:30 pm Central after the new comedy series Go On, as part of the 2012–13 United States network television schedule. On October 2, 2012, NBC commissioned a full season of The New Normal.

On May 11, 2013, NBC cancelled the series after one season.

Plot
Bryan (Andrew Rannells) and David (Justin Bartha) are a happy gay couple living in Los Angeles, with successful careers. The only thing missing in their relationship is a baby. They meet Goldie Clemmons (Georgia King), a single  mother and waitress from Ohio. Goldie left her adulterous husband and moved to L.A. with her 9-year-old daughter Shania (Bebe Wood) to escape their former life and start over. Jane (Ellen Barkin), Goldie's conservative grandmother, follows them to the city against Goldie's wishes, thus causing havoc for her granddaughter and the couple. Goldie decides to become Bryan and David's gestational surrogate, and naturally, her family gets involved.

Cast and characters

Main cast
 Justin Bartha as David Bartholomew Sawyer, an obstetrician
 Andrew Rannells as Bryan Collins, a television producer who is the showrunner for the hit television series Sing (a thinly veiled spoof of series creator/showrunner Ryan Murphy's real-life television series Glee.)
 Georgia King as Goldie Clemmons, David and Bryan's surrogate. A shy working-class waitress from Ohio, she runs off to California with her daughter Shania after finding her husband Clay in bed with another woman, and signs up to be a surrogate in hope of using the money to achieve a dream of going to law school, though she eventually chooses to follow her passion and starts designing clothing for children.
 Bebe Wood as Shania Clemmons, Goldie and Clay's 9-year-old daughter.
 NeNe Leakes as Rocky Rhoades, Bryan's production assistant (P.A.) and later a producer on Sing.
 Jayson Blair as Clay Clemmons, Goldie's estranged husband and Shania's father.
 Ellen Barkin as Jane Forrest, Goldie's grandmother. A staunchly Republican real-estate agent prone to making outrageously racist and homophobic statements, she follows Goldie and Shania to California and is unwilling to return to Ohio without them.

Recurring cast
 Jackie Hoffman as Frances, David's mother
 Barry Bostwick as Marty, David's father
 Mary Kay Place as Colleen, Bryan's mother
 Marlo Thomas as Nancy Niles, Jane's boss
 Cheri Oteri as Carla, Bryan and David's baby consultant
 John Stamos as Brice, Jane's love interest and co-worker at Niles and Windsor Realtors
 Michael Hitchcock as Gary, the head of the surrogacy firm
 John Benjamin Hickey as Father Michael
Sterling Sulieman as Clint, Rocky's brother

Episodes

Development and production

On January 27, 2012, NBC officially ordered the project to pilot, which was co-written by co-creators/executive producers Ryan Murphy and Ali Adler, while being directed by Murphy.

Casting announcements began in January 2012, with Andrew Rannells first cast in the role of Bryan Collins, one half of the gay couple who decides to use a surrogate to have a baby. Ellen Barkin was next cast in the series as Jane Forrest, Goldie's Republican grandmother. Justin Bartha and Georgia King both then joined the series. Bartha signed on to play David Bartholomew Sawyer, the other half of the aforementioned gay couple; and King joined the series as Goldie Clemmons, a cash-strapped waitress and mother, who becomes Bryan and David's surrogate. Bebe Wood followed with her cast in the role of Shania Clemmons, Goldie and Clay's daughter. NeNe Leakes was the last actor cast in the series as Rocky, Bryan's assistant.

On May 7, 2012, the show was picked up to series. It premiered on September 11, 2012. Jayson Blair originally signed on to the series as Clay Clemmons, in a recurring role. However, after the pilot was ordered to series, Blair was then upped to series regular.

The Halloween episode "Para-New Normal Activity" was originally scheduled to air on October 30, 2012, but was pre-empted by NBC's coverage of Hurricane Sandy. The episode was ultimately aired in March 2013.

Marketing
On August 29, 2012, NBC released the pilot episode online as a "preview", prior to the official premiere on September 11, 2012. A similar marketing strategy was made with The New Normal'''s time-slot companion Go On, which aired its first episode on August 8, 2012, post the 2012 Summer Olympics.

Release

Critical receptionThe New Normal received mixed reviews from critics. The first season received a 61 out of 100 aggregate score, based on 32 critics' responses, indicating "mixed or average" reception at Metacritic. Review aggregator website Rotten Tomatoes rated it 51% "rotten" based on 47 reviews with average rating of 5.90 out of 10 with the consensus, "The New Normal is heartfelt and briskly paced, but it suffers from one-dimensional characters and jarring tonal shifts.". Robert Bianco of USA Today called it a "surprisingly touching comedy," adding "For the most part, Normal plays like a lovely, small movie, mixing humorous moments with sweet, gentle grace notes. At its best, it plays like a Woody Allen film, something you may notice most when secondary characters stop and explain themselves to the camera." Linda Stasi of the New York Post thought the series was "pretty darned good," adding "The New Normal finds its game when it's funny without trying so hard and sweet when it should be. At times Normal is so touching you might pull out a tissue, or maybe a diaper." Ken Tucker of Entertainment Weekly gave the series a B grade, saying it contains "a mixture of sarcasm and sentimentality that isn't remotely realistic, but can be funny." David Hinckley of the New York Daily News called the series "a bumpy ride," adding "The New Normal wants what Modern Family is having. But if we're going to catapult from South Park to a Hallmark movie, we need a smoother ride."

On August 24, 2012, representatives from KSL-TV, the NBC affiliate in Salt Lake City, Utah, announced the station, which is owned by the Church of Jesus Christ of Latter-day Saints, would not carry The New Normal'', citing content they believed to be inappropriate for broadcast during the family hour. KUCW, the state's CW affiliate, picked up the series and aired it on Saturday nights.

The show has been criticized for perpetuating racial stereotypes and using a person born intersex as an object of derision.

Home media
Fox Home Entertainment released the complete series on DVD on May 13, 2014, titled "The New Normal - The Complete 1st Season". The item was released exclusively from online retailer Amazon.com.

Broadcasts
In Canada, CTV held the rights to simsub the NBC broadcast in most areas.

In Mexico, it was broadcast by Fox broadcasting company.
In Greece, it was broadcast by Foxlife.
Exclusive Fox broadcasting company first-run contracted broadcasters have the rights in Australia on Network Ten from October 14, 2012, with the show being preempted twice due to ratings, in New Zealand on TV3 (New Zealand) from March 21, 2013, and in Israel on the yes pay television network scheduled for Saturday at 7 pm.

In other areas the rights have been acquired for the United Kingdom by Channel 4 on E4 from January 10, 2013, at 9 pm.

Awards and nominations

References

External links
 

2012 American television series debuts
2013 American television series endings
2010s American LGBT-related comedy television series
2010s American romantic comedy television series
2010s American single-camera sitcoms
American LGBT-related sitcoms
English-language television shows
Gay-related television shows
NBC original programming
Same-sex marriage in television
Television series by 20th Century Fox Television
Television series created by Ryan Murphy (writer)
Television shows set in Los Angeles
Television works about intersex
Television series created by Ali Adler